František Langer (3 March 1888 – 2 August 1965) was a Czech-Jewish playwright, screenwriter, essayist, literary critic, publicist and  military physician.

Life 
Langer was born and in Prague, Austria-Hungary in a Czech speaking Jewish family. He studied medicine at Charles University. He served in Czechoslovak Legions in Russia during the World War I as a physician. In 1935-1938 he worked as a dramatic adviser in Vinohrady Theatre and as a commander of a Prague military hospital. He spent World War II in England as a brigade general of the Czechoslovak army abroad.

His younger brother  was a Hebrew poet and scholar Jiří Langer.

Work 

The main focus of Langer's work is in drama:

Velbloud uchem jehly (aka The Camel through the Needle's Eye) (1923)
Periférie (aka The Outskirts) (1925)
Grandhotel Nevada (1927)
Obrácení Ferdyše Pištory (The Conversion of Ferdyš Pištora, 1929)
Jízdní hlídka (aka The Cavalry Watch) (1935)
Dvaasedmdesátka (1937)
Děti a dýka (The Kids and the Dagger, 1942)
Pražské legendy (Prague Legends, 1956)
Železný vlk (The Iron Wolf, 1923) - short stories

Orders, decorations and medals
  Order of Tomáš Garrigue Masaryk, II. Class, 1995 in memoriam
  Czechoslovak War Cross 1918
  Czechoslovak War Cross 1939-1945  
  Czechoslovak Order of the Hawk with swords
  Czechoslovak Order of the Hawk with a star
  Czechoslovak Revolutionary Medal
  Victory Medal
  Czechoslovak Medal for Merit 1st Class
  Commemorative Medal of Czechoslovak Army Abroad
  Croix de Guerre 1939–1945

References 

1888 births
1965 deaths
Czech Jews
20th-century Czech dramatists and playwrights
Czech male dramatists and playwrights
Czech screenwriters
Male screenwriters
Czech medical writers
Recipients of the Order of Tomáš Garrigue Masaryk
20th-century screenwriters
Burials at Vyšehrad Cemetery
Charles University alumni